Agnes of Antioch ( 1154 – c. 1184) was Queen of Hungary from 1172 until 1184 as the first wife of Béla III.

The accidental discovery of her intact tomb during the Hungarian Revolution of 1848 has provided an opportunity for patriotic demonstrations. She was the only 12th-century Hungarian queen whose remains were studied by scientists, and her appearance was reconstructed.

Life
She was the daughter of Raynald of Châtillon, and Constance, Princess of Antioch.

The exact date of her birth is uncertain. It is assumed that she was born soon after the secret marriage of her parents, which took place before May 1153. The most common belief in historiography was that Agnes was born in 1154. At the baptism she probably received the name of Agnes.

In Constantinople. Marriage
Her father was captured by the Muslims in November 1160 and was confined in Aleppo for the next fifteen years. Princess Constance died c. 1163/67, and around 1170 Agnes went to Constantinople, where her older half-sister Maria had been living as the wife of the Byzantine Emperor Manuel I Comnenus. On the Emperor's request, Agnes was married to Caesar Alexios (born prince Béla of Hungary), who had been engaged to the Emperor's daughter, Maria Comnena, until the birth of Manuel's son, Alexios in 1166. The wedding date of Agnes and Alexios is unknown; is believed that may have occurred about 1168 and no later than 1172. In historiography, there are two precises dated for the wedding: September 1169 and March 1171.

She received the name Anna in the imperial court. In the Hungarians documents she always appeared with her new name, probably because Agnes was rare at that time.

Queen of Hungary
The new couple went on a pilgrimage to Jerusalem where they made a donation for the Knights Hospitaller. In the summer, after the death of King Stephen III of Hungary (4 March 1172), her husband ascended the throne as King Béla III, and they moved to Hungary. Anna was crowned queen alongside her husband at the Cathedral Basilica of Saint Stephen in Székesfehérvár on 13 January 1173.

The spread of French cultural patterns in the Kingdom of Hungary is attributed to Anna/Agnes.

The queen's activities were also connected with the presence in Hungary of the first Cistercian monks, who came from Burgundy. Anna could keep in touch with Burgundian Cistercians through ancestral linkages. The first Cistercian monastery in Hungary, founded in 1182, was in fact closely associated with three Cistercian abbeys located near Pontigny and the surrounding estates belonged to the Donzy family, from which Anna descended.

Issue

During her marriage, Anna gave birth to at least six children:

 King Emeric of Hungary (1174 – 30 September/November 1204).
 Margaret (1175 – after 1223), wife firstly of Emperor Isaac II Angelos, secondly of King Boniface I of Thessalonica and thirdly of Nicolas of Saint-Omer.
 King Andrew II of Hungary (c. 1177 – 21 September 1235).
 Salomon (died young).
 Stephen (died young).
 Constance (c. 1180 – 6 December 1240), wife of king Ottokar I of Bohemia.

Anna was the ancestress of all subsequent kings of Hungary, as well as the Hungarian princesses, and by marriage of the Piast duchesses St. Kinga and Bl. Jolenta of Poland. In addition, from her descended the kings of Bohemia from the Přemyslid, Luxembourg, Jagiellon and Habsburg families.

Death

Anna's death date was not recorded in any contemporary source, but it is assumed that she died in the year 1184, although it is possible she died a little earlier than that.

Burial

Anna was buried at Cathedral Basilica of Saint Stephen in Székesfehérvár. Her remains were confidently identified by archeologists during late-19th-century excavations at the ruined cathedral of Székesfehérvár. Her remains were afterwards reinterred at the Mathias Church in Budapest, with those of her husband.

References

Sources
 Korai Magyar Történeti Lexikon (9-14. század), főszerkesztő: Kristó Gyula, szerkesztők: Engel Pál és Makk Ferenc (Akadémiai Kiadó, Budapest, 1994)

|-

1150s births
1180s deaths
Burials at the Basilica of the Assumption of the Blessed Virgin Mary
House of Árpád
Hungarian queens consort
12th-century Hungarian women

Year of birth uncertain
Year of death uncertain